"Classic" is a song by New York City-based electronic music duo The Knocks. Released on 17 September 2014 through Neon Gold Records and Big Beat Records, it was the main single from the duo's third extended play, entitled So Classic (2015). The vocals featured are by Crista Ru, the lead singer of alternative pop duo POWERS. It was written by Ben Ruttner, James Patterson, Mike Del Rio, and Crista Ru.

The music video which served as an accompaniment to the song was uploaded to The Knocks' official YouTube account and, as of early 2021, has been viewed over 5.7 million times. The video is modeled after the video game The Sims 4.

The song appears in “Crystal Clear”, Season 18, Episode 21 of the animated comedy series American Dad!

Track listings

Credits
 Assistant Mixing Engineer: Ryan Jumper
 Mastering Engineer: John Horesco
 Mixing Engineer: Miles Walker
 Producer: The Knocks, Mike Del Rio
 Programming: The Knocks, Mike Del Rio
 Writer(s): Ben Ruttner, Crista Ru, James Patterson, Mike Del Rio

References

2014 singles
2014 songs
The Knocks songs
Song recordings produced by the Knocks
Songs written by Mike Del Rio